Nargesabad may refer to:
 Nargesabad, East Azerbaijan
 Nargesabad, Fars